Charopella wilkinsoni, also known as Wilkinson's pinwheel snail, is a species of air-breathing land snail, a terrestrial pulmonate gastropod mollusc in the pinwheel snail family, that is endemic to Australia's Lord Howe Island in the Tasman Sea.

Description
The shell of these snails are 1.3–1.7 mm in height, with a diameter of 3–3.6 mm. The colour is pale golden-brown with cream or orange-brown flammulations (flame-like markings). The shape is discoidal with a low spire, whorls shouldered with an angulate periphery, with fine, closely-spaced radial ribs. The umbilicus is widely open. The aperture is rounded and lunate. The animal has a white body with dark grey eyestalks.

Distribution and habitat
The snail is found across the island; it is most common at the northern end, living in plant litter in rainforest and moist woodland.

References

 
 

 
wilkinsoni
Gastropods of Lord Howe Island
Taxa named by John Brazier
Gastropods described in 1889